The Workers' Youth League (Arbetarnas Ungdomsförbund, abbreviated AUF) was the youth organization of the Communist Party of Sweden. It was active during 1924–1926.

AUF published Arbetets Ungdom (Youth of Labour).

Youth wings of communist parties
Youth wings of political parties in Sweden
1924 establishments in Sweden
1926 disestablishments in Sweden
Communist Party of Sweden (1924)